Ulukau: The Hawaiian Electronic Library is an online, digital library of Native Hawaiian reference material for cultural and Hawaiian language studies. The services are free and are provided and maintained by Kahaka ‘Ula O Ke’elikolani College of Hawaiian Language at the University of Hawaii at Hilo and Ka Waihona Puke 'Ōiwi Native Hawaiian Library at Alu Like. The site is available worldwide, containing Hawaiian language newspapers, books and other resources with mirror sites in both English and Native Hawaiian. Western studies of Hawaii tend to ignore the Hawaiian language newspapers. These digital archives serve to make these sources available for educational and scholarly work. The collaboration between Ho‘olaupa‘i, Hale Kaumo‘o and Alu Like contain the largest collection of digitized native language newspapers in the Pacific with nearly 125,000 pages accessible within Ulukau. The library's digital dictionary, is Nā Puke Wehewehe ‘Ōlelo Hawai‘i. In the Hawaiian language, the term Puke Wehewehe ‘Ōlelo means dictionary. Photographer Ed Greevy, who helped illustrate several books including: "A Nation Rising: Hawaiian Movements for Life, Land, and Sovereignty", has donated a good deal of his work to the Hawaiian electronic library.

External links 
 ulukau.org (Hawaiian language)
 ulukau.org (English language version)

References

Native Hawaiian history
Native Hawaiian culture